Palaquium obovatum is a tree in the family Sapotaceae. The specific epithet obovatum means "egg-shaped", referring to the leaves.

Description
The bark is red brown. Inflorescences bear up to 10 flowers. The latex has been used as a low-quality gutta-percha.

Distribution and habitat
Palaquium obovatum is native to India, Indo-China and Malesia. Its habitat is in limestone and other types of lowland tropical forest.

References

obovatum
Flora of Indo-China
Flora of Malesia
Plants described in 1854